François Le Levé (1882-1945), was born in Locmiquélic, Morbihan. Militant anarcho-syndicalist. Le Levé was one of fifteen anarchists who signed The Manifesto of the Sixteen, along with Peter Kropotkin, Jean Grave and others, favoring the Allies during World War I. (Overwhelmingly, anarchists refused to take sides, opposing the killing in favor of class war; see, for example, Errico Malatesta.)

A member of the French Resistance during World War II, Le Leve was captured and interned. He died while traveling home after being liberated.

External links
 Le Leve Ephéméride Anarchiste 
 Manifeste de seize / Manifesto of the Sixteen Anarchist Encyclopedia

1882 births
1945 deaths
Anarcho-syndicalists
People from Morbihan
French Resistance members
French anarchists
French prisoners and detainees
French syndicalists